Esa Hietanen (15 July 1896, in Suonenjoki – 15 October 1962) was a Finnish logger, sawmill worker, journalist and politician. He was in prison for political reasons from 1926 to 1927, from 1930 to 1934 and from 1939 to 1940. He was a member of the Parliament of Finland from 1945 until his death in 1962, representing the Finnish People's Democratic League (SKDL). He was a member of the Central Committee of the Communist Party of Finland (SKP).

References

1896 births
1962 deaths
People from Suonenjoki
People from Kuopio Province (Grand Duchy of Finland)
Communist Party of Finland politicians
Finnish People's Democratic League politicians
Members of the Parliament of Finland (1945–48)
Members of the Parliament of Finland (1948–51)
Members of the Parliament of Finland (1951–54)
Members of the Parliament of Finland (1954–58)
Members of the Parliament of Finland (1958–62)
Finnish people of World War II
Prisoners and detainees of Finland